George Sefcik (December 27, 1939 – January 23, 2016), was an American football coach. He was the offensive coordinator of the Kansas City Chiefs in 1988, and the Atlanta Falcons from 1997 through 2001. He coached in 2 Super Bowls - XXXIII with the Atlanta Falcons and XVI with the Cincinnati Bengals. He has a total of 29 years coaching experience in the National Football League as an assistant coach and offensive coordinator. He was also a college football coach and offensive coordinator for 9 years.

Sefcik played football and baseball (3 year lettermen) for the University of Notre Dame in South Bend, Indiana from 1959 through 1962.

Sefcik played football and baseball (3 year lettermen) for Benedictine High School in Cleveland, Ohio from 1955 through 1958. He was a member of the 1957 Benedictine football team state champions and played/started at 4 positions - left halfback (offense), safety (defense), kicker and punter (special teams).

Sefcik died on January 23, 2016. He was survived by his wife and three children.

References

1939 births
2016 deaths
American football running backs
Atlanta Falcons coaches
Baltimore Colts coaches
Cincinnati Bengals coaches
Cleveland Browns coaches
Green Bay Packers coaches
Kansas City Chiefs coaches
Kentucky Wildcats football coaches
New York Giants coaches
Notre Dame Fighting Irish football players
Players of American football from Cleveland
Sportspeople from Cleveland